

See also
List of clashes in the North Caucasus in 2009
List of clashes in the North Caucasus in 2010
List of clashes in the North Caucasus in 2011
List of clashes in the North Caucasus in 2012
List of clashes in the North Caucasus in 2015
List of clashes in the North Caucasus in 2016
List of clashes in the North Caucasus in 2017
List of clashes in the North Caucasus in 2019

References

Clashes in the North Caucasus
Clashes in the North Caucasus
North Caucasus
Lists of clashes in the North Caucasus
Lists of armed conflicts in 2018